Boyd's Marriage Index is a tangled typescript bound in 533 volumes listing more than 3,500,000 English marriages for the period 1538 to 1837.  It is held by the Society of Genealogists, London.

It may also be viewed on fiche or searched using printed copies. It has now been transcribed and may be searched online or (in parts) on CD. It is only an index - a list of pointers (locators) to where material may be found and does not contain month and day details of the records it contains, just the year.

Index entries contain the surname and Christian name(s) of the bride and groom, the year, county and parish where the marriage took place, and source of the record.   The original Index is held at the Society of Genealogists and it may be searched online through the subscription website Findmypast.

Coverage
All English counties are covered, though none completely, and the periods indexed vary according to the copies of records which were readily available. Registers from over 4,300 parishes have been indexed, a total of over 7 million individuals or "names". Well over a million of these names relate to the London and Middlesex areas.

There are two basic series.
The first (Main) series is arranged in county order;
The second series, is arranged in phonetic name order.
Other supplements have been completed since Boyd's death in 1955.

There are some errors in the Boyd's indexes and information should always be checked against the original sources.

Compilation
The index was initially compiled at his expense by Percival Boyd, MA, FSA, FSG (1866–1955) and his staff between 1925 and Boyd's death in 1955 from printed and transcribed parish registers, Bishop's Transcripts (copies of the registers sent annually to the relevant bishop or archdeacon, marriage licences, banns and other sources. A number of further supplements to Boyd's index are now available.

Searching
Note from the following Guildhall Library instructions the complexity of searching fiche or printed copies:

See also
Pallot's Marriage Index

References

External links
 Society of  Genealogists

British genealogy
18th century in England
19th century in England
Marriage, unions and partnerships in England